Kirchberg v. Feenstra, 450 U.S. 455 (1981), was a United States Supreme Court case in which the Court held a Louisiana Head and Master law, which gave sole control of marital property to the husband and indicate the husband's dominance over the wife in the marriage, unconstitutional.

Background 
In 1974, Joan Feenstra charged her husband Harold had molested their daughter. Harold hired an attorney, Karl Kirchberg, to defend himself against the charges, and mortgaged the Feenstras' home toward paying the cost of that attorney. Joan was not informed of this mortgage because Head and Master provisions of Louisiana law allowed him to do so without her consent or knowledge. She dropped the charges, and the couple separated. Joan did not learn about the mortgage until 1976, when Harold's attorney returned to demand payment and threatened foreclosure. She then filed a lawsuit arguing that Louisiana's laws giving sole control of marital property to the husband were unconstitutional.

The district court upheld Louisiana's law. On appeal, the Fifth Circuit overturned the district court, finding the law unconstitutionally violated the Equal Protection Clause, but limited the application of their ruling to future decisions. Feenstra appealed to the Supreme Court.

Opinion of the Court 

Applying intermediate scrutiny as they had in Craig v. Boren, the court held that Louisiana's law lacked an "exceedingly persuasive justification" for its sex-based classification, and therefore was in violation of the Equal Protection Clause of the Fourteenth Amendment.

Further developments 
In 1980, during the appeals process, Louisiana changed their laws to eliminate the Head and Master provisions.

Obergefell v. Hodges 
In 2015, during oral arguments in the same-sex marriage case Obergefell v. Hodges U.S. Supreme Court Justice Ruth Bader Ginsburg used the example of the Supreme Court's striking down of Louisiana's Head and Master rule in Kirchberg v. Feenstra to illustrate how "traditional" concepts of marriage had been revised over time.

References

External links
 

1981 in United States case law
United States Supreme Court cases
United States equal protection case law
United States Supreme Court cases of the Rehnquist Court
Gender discrimination lawsuits
United States gender discrimination case law
Marriage law in the United States
Legal history of Louisiana
History of women in Louisiana